Joy Franz (born June 13, 1941 in Modesto, California) is an American actress and singer, best known for her stage work. She is currently appearing as the Dowager Empress in US National Tour of Anastasia. She played Susan in the original 1972 West End production of Stephen Sondheim's Company, and the role of Cinderella's Stepmother in the original 1987 Broadway production of Sondheim's Into the Woods. (She also understudied the role of the Witch).

She reprised her role of Cinderella’s Stepmother in Into the Woods twice. First, in the 1988-90 US Tour, and then again in the 2002 Broadway revival. In the Broadway revival she also played Little Red’s Granny and understudied the role of Jack’s Mother.

She was one of the Street Singers in the world premiere of Leonard Bernstein's Mass at the John F. Kennedy Center for the Performing Arts on September 8, 1971. She currently portrays the role of the Mother in My Damn Channel's television series Horrible People.

References

External links

Joy Franz Official Website

Living people
1941 births
Actresses from Modesto, California
Singers from California
American musical theatre actresses
American television actresses
20th-century American actresses
21st-century American women